{{Infobox Election
| election_name = 1960 United States presidential election in Virginia
| country = Virginia
| type = presidential
| ongoing = no
| previous_election = 1956 United States presidential election in Virginia
| previous_year = 1956
| next_election = 1964 United States presidential election in Virginia
| next_year = 1964
| election_date = November 8, 1960
| image_size = x200px
| image1 = Unsuccessful 1960.jpg
| nominee1 = Richard Nixon
| party1 = Republican Party (United States)
| home_state1 = California
| running_mate1 = Henry Cabot Lodge, Jr.
| electoral_vote1 = 12
| popular_vote1 = 404,521
| percentage1 = 52.4%
| image2 = Jfk2 (3x4).jpg
| nominee2 = John F. Kennedy
| party2 = Democratic Party (United States)
| home_state2 = Massachusetts
| running_mate2 = Lyndon B. Johnson
| electoral_vote2 = 0
| popular_vote2 = 362,327
| percentage2 = 47.0%
| map_image = Virginia Presidential Election Results 1960.svg
| map_size = 435px
| map_caption = County and Independent City ResultsNixonKennedy| title = President
| before_election = Dwight Eisenhower
| before_party = Republican Party (United States)
| after_election = John F. Kennedy
| after_party = Democratic Party (United States)
}}

The 1960 United States presidential election in Virginia''' took place on November 8, 1960. Voters chose 12 representatives, or electors to the Electoral College, who voted for president and vice president.

Virginia voted for the Republican nominee, incumbent Vice President Richard Nixon, over the Democratic nominee, Senator John F. Kennedy. Kennedy ultimately won the national election with 49.72% of the vote. This is the first time a Democrat was elected president without carrying the state of Virginia, and the only time between 1924 and 1976 that Virginia backed the losing candidate. 

, this is the last occasion when Appomattox County, Campbell County, Lunenburg County, Mecklenburg County and Pittsylvania County have voted for a Democratic presidential candidate.

Results

Results by county

References

Virgin
1960
1960 Virginia elections